The 2019 Camping World 300 is a NASCAR Xfinity Series race held on June 29, 2019, at Chicagoland Speedway in Joliet, Illinois. Contested over 200 laps on the  intermediate speedway, it was the 15th race of the 2019 NASCAR Xfinity Series season.

Background

Track

Chicagoland Speedway is a  tri-oval speedway in Joliet, Illinois, southwest of Chicago. The speedway opened in 2001 and currently hosts NASCAR races. Until 2011, the speedway also hosted the IndyCar Series, recording numerous close finishes, including the closest finish in IndyCar history. The speedway is owned and operated by International Speedway Corporation and is located adjacent to Route 66 Raceway.

Entry list

Practice

First practice

Final practice

Qualifying

Qualifying results

 Josh Bilicki failed to qualify his No. 93 RSS Racing Chevrolet but drove the No. 17 Rick Ware Racing Chevrolet in the race since Bayley Currey (who qualified the car) got ill.

Race

Summary
Joey Logano began on pole. Cole Custer passed him after 3 laps. The first caution was thrown for Justin Allgaier spinning out on lap 13. Allgaier would later crash into the wall in the second half of the race, ending his day early. Custer and Logano continued to battle for the lead, with Custer winning the first stage. He would maintain the lead until Logano regained it on lap 80. A caution was thrown after Ryan Sieg spun out due to a flat tire, and Custer opted to pit, while Logano did not get tires and won the second stage.

Custer retook the lead on lap 116, dominating for the next run. He gave up the lead on lap 154 after taking a green-flag pit stop. Michael Annett and Noah Gragson decided to stay out and stretch their fuel run. B. J. McLeod made contact with the wall later, bringing out the final caution. Ross Chastain was able to return to the lead lap. The final green flag run lasted 21 laps. Custer jumped out to the lead and won the race with a 3-second lead over Logano.

Stage Results

Stage One
Laps: 45

Stage Two
Laps: 45

Final Stage Results

Stage Three
Laps: 110

After the race
Christopher Bell's car failed post-race inspection, disqualifying him from his third-place finish. He was credited as finishing last, also losing his 17-stage points. For the inspection, NASCAR had the team take the shocks off the car so it can be compared to pre-race inspection. The front of Bell's car was "extremely low" and the rear was slightly higher. Bell's disqualification is the second one to occur under 2019's inspection format, following Chastain's disqualification in the truck series at Iowa in mid-June and is the first Xfinity disqualification since 1995.

References

Camping World 300
NASCAR races at Chicagoland Speedway
Camping World 300
2019 NASCAR Xfinity Series